Julián Francisco Barajas Robles (born 25 July 1997) is a Mexican footballer who plays as a midfielder for Cafetaleros de Chiapas.

He made his professional debut with Tijuana on 20 July 2016, playing the full 90 minutes of a Copa MX victory against Toluca.

References

External links
 

1997 births
Living people
Association football midfielders
Club Tijuana footballers
Murciélagos FC footballers
Gavilanes de Matamoros footballers
Cafetaleros de Chiapas footballers
Ascenso MX players
Liga Premier de México players
Tercera División de México players
Footballers from Colima
Mexican footballers
People from Tecomán, Colima